The 1938 International Lawn Tennis Challenge was the 33rd edition of what is now known as the Davis Cup. 21 teams entered the Europe Zone, while 4 entered the Americas Zone.

Australia defeated Japan in the Americas Zone final, while in the Europe Zone final Germany defeated Yugoslavia. Australia defeated Germany in the Inter-Zonal play-off, but were defeated in the Challenge Round by defending champions the United States. The final was played at the Germantown Cricket Club in Philadelphia, Pennsylvania, United States on 3–5 September.

America Zone

Draw

Final
Australia vs. Japan

Europe Zone

Draw

Final
Germany vs. Yugoslavia

Inter-Zonal Final
Australia vs. Germany

Challenge Round
United States vs. Australia

See also
 1938 Wightman Cup

Notes

References

External links
Davis Cup official website

Davis Cups by year
 
International Lawn Tennis Challenge
International Lawn Tennis Challenge
International Lawn Tennis Challenge